Sir John Dunamace Heaton-Armstrong  (21 February 1888 – 27 August 1967) was a long-serving English officer of arms at the College of Arms in London.

Early life and education
Heaton-Armstrong was born at Salisbury House, Edmonton, the son of the Austrian-born politician and businessman William Heaton-Armstrong and his wife, Baroness Bertha Adalberta Maximiliana Zois-Edelstein, who came from an ennobled Habsburg family. She was the granddaughter of Karl von Zois, whose brother was Sigmund Zois. Heaton-Armstrong was educated at Eton College and Trinity Hall, Cambridge.

Military service
During the First World War, Heaton-Armstrong was commissioned into the Cavalry Branch of the Reserve of Officers of the British Indian Army as a second lieutenant, and was later promoted to lieutenant. 

His first heraldic appointment at the College came on 6 April 1922, when he was made Rouge Dragon Pursuivant of Arms in Ordinary. On 14 October 1926, Heaton-Armstrong was promoted to the position of Chester Herald of Arms in Ordinary. This office was made vacant by the promotion of Arthur Cochrane to the office of Norroy King of Arms.  He was made a Member of the Royal Victorian Order (fourth class) (MVO) in 1937.

While holding this post, Heaton-Armstrong took a leave from the College of Arms to fight in World War II. During this conflict, he rose to the rank of squadron leader in the Administrative and Special Duties Branch of the Royal Air Force. He relinquished his commission in 1944, and returned to the College of Arms, and was knighted in the Coronation Honours of 1953.

Service as Clarenceux King of Arms
In 1956, with the death of Archibald George Blomefield Russel, Heaton-Armstrong was promoted to the office of Clarenceux King of Arms. As such, he was responsible for the granting of arms in his jurisdiction south of the River Trent. While Chester Herald, Heaton-Armstrong was appointed to the honorary post of Inspector of Royal Air Force Badges, which post he held for the rest of his life. Heaton-Armstrong continued to serve as Clarenceux until his own death in late 1967.

Arms

See also
Pursuivant
Herald

References

External links

CUHAGS Officer of Arms Index

1888 births
1967 deaths
People educated at Eton College
Alumni of Trinity Hall, Cambridge
People from Edmonton, London
English officers of arms
Knights Bachelor
British genealogists
Members of the Royal Victorian Order
Royal Air Force officers
British people of Austrian descent